The 1819 Rhode Island gubernatorial election was an uncontested election held on April 21, 1819 to elect the Governor of Rhode Island. Nehemiah Rice Knight, the incumbent Governor and Democratic-Republican nominee, was the only candidate and so won with 100% of the vote.

General election

Candidates
Nehemiah Rice Knight, the incumbent Governor since 1817.

Results

County results

References

Rhode Island gubernatorial elections
1819 Rhode Island elections
Rhode Island
April 1819 events